The 1899 Colgate football team represented Colgate University in the 1899 college football season. Colgate reports the record for the season as 3–5, however, a reporting error in early record keeping failed to account for an 11–0 victory over Colgate Academy.

Schedule

References

Colgate
Colgate Raiders football seasons
Colgate football